Nationality words link to articles with information on the nation's poetry or literature (for instance, Irish or France).

Works published

Great Britain
 George Chapman, translator, The Georgicks of Hesiod, from the Greek of Hesiod's Works and Days
 Sir John Harington, The Most Elegant and Witty Epigrams of Sir John Harrington (see also Epigrams Both Pleasant and Serious 1615)
 John Taylor, The Pennylesse Pilgrimage

Other
Jacob Cats, Emblemata or Minnebeelden with Maegdenplicht, Netherlands
Etienne de Pleure, Sacra Aeneis, cento
Juan Martínez de Jáuregui y Aguilar, Rimas,  lyrics, including translations of Horace, Martial and Ausonius, with a controversial preface which attracts much attention because of its strong opposition to the culteranismo of Luis de Góngora, Spain

Births
Death years link to the corresponding "[year] in poetry" article:
 Late – Abraham Cowley (died 1667), English
 Wu Jiaji (died 1684), Chinese

Deaths
Birth years link to the corresponding "[year] in poetry" article:
 April 19 – Thomas Bastard (born 1566), English poet and clergyman
 July – John Davies of Hereford (born 1565), Anglo-Welsh poet
 August 23 – Gerbrand Adriaensz Bredero (born 1585), Dutch poet and playwright
 September 28 – Josuah Sylvester (born 1563), English poet
 October 29 – Sir Walter Ralegh (born c. 1554), English adventurer and author, executed
 December 6 – Jacques Davy Duperron (born 1556), French cardinal, politician and poet
 Also:
 Richard Stanihurst, also spelled "Stanyhurst" (born 1547), Irish translator, poet, historian and alchemist
 Probable year – Bento Teixeira (born c. 1561), Portuguese poet

Notes

17th-century poetry
Poetry